Random! Cartoons is an American animated anthology series that aired on Nicktoons. Much like Oh Yeah! Cartoons, it was created by Fred Seibert and produced by Frederator Incorporated and Nickelodeon Animation Studio. It premiered on December 6, 2008, and ended on December 20, 2009.

Production
Creator Fred Seibert ordered 13 half-hour episodes (39 7-minute segments) for the series, which was originally announced in 2005 as the fourth season of Oh Yeah! Cartoons. Production on the series started in 2005 and ended in 2007. Originally slated to air on Nickelodeon by the end of 2007, it was later halted for release in 2008 on the separate Nicktoons Network channel. The shorts were first released on air and online individually on January 2007.

Unlike Oh Yeah! Cartoons, there is no host. On January 10, 2006, ASIFA-Hollywood hosted an advance screening of six shorts as well as a Q&A session with the filmmakers at the Nicktoons Studios in Burbank, California. Two of the shorts were selected to become television series and one of the shorts was selected to become a web series. Those shorts were Adventure Time, The Bravest Warriors and Fanboy. Adventure Time began airing as a full-length series on April 5, 2010, on Cartoon Network. The Bravest Warriors, under the new name Bravest Warriors, began airing on November 8, 2012, on Cartoon Hangover. Fanboy, under the new name Fanboy & Chum Chum, began airing as a full-length series on November 7, 2009, on Nickelodeon.

List of episodes

Legacy
Random! Cartoons is the third Frederator Studios short cartoon shorts "incubator". Frederator has persisted in the tradition of surfacing new talent, characters and series with several cartoon shorts "incubators," including (as of 2016): What a Cartoon! (Cartoon Network, 1995), The Meth Minute 39 (Channel Frederator, 2008), Random! Cartoons (Nickelodeon/Nicktoons, 2008), Too Cool! Cartoons (Cartoon Hangover, 2012), and GO! Cartoons (Cartoon Hangover, 2016). These laboratories have spun off notable series like: Dexter's Laboratory, The Powerpuff Girls, Johnny Bravo, Cow & Chicken, Courage the Cowardly Dog, The Fairly OddParents, Nite Fite, Fanboy & Chum Chum, Adventure Time, Bravest Warriors, Rocket Dog, and Bee and PuppyCat.

Filmography 
Fred Seibert cartoon shorts filmography

See also

Spike and Mike's Festival of Animation
Liquid Television
Raw Toonage
What a Cartoon!
KaBlam!
Cartoon Sushi
Oh Yeah! Cartoons
Exposure
Eye Drops
VH1 ILL-ustrated
Nicktoons Film Festival
Short Circutz
Funpak
Shorty McShorts' Shorts
Wedgies
The Cartoonstitute
Off the Air
Nickelodeon Animated Shorts Program
Too Cool! Cartoons
Cartoon Network Shorts Department
TripTank
Disney XD Shortstop
Go! Cartoons
Love, Death & Robots

References

External links
 Episode list at the Internet Movie Database
 Official Hornswiggle site
 Official Kyle+Rosemary site
 
 Official Flavio cartoon site

2008 American television series debuts
2009 American television series endings
2000s American animated television series
2000s American anthology television series
2000s American sketch comedy television series
2000s American variety television series
American animated variety television series
American children's animated anthology television series
American children's animated comedy television series
American flash animated television series
Children's sketch comedy
English-language television shows
Frederator Studios
Nicktoons
Nicktoons (TV network) original programming